Deiver Andrés Machado Mena (born 2 September 1993) is a Colombian professional footballer who plays as a left-back and left winger for Ligue 1 club Lens.

Club career 
In 2020, Deiver Machado joined Ligue 2 club Toulouse FC as a free agent. 

On 2 July 2021, he joined Ligue 1 club RC Lens for three years. On 31 January, he extended his contract with Lens until 2026.

International career
Machado was named in Colombia's provisional squad for Copa América Centenario but was cut from the final squad.

References

External links
 
 
 

Living people
1993 births
Sportspeople from Chocó Department
Colombian footballers
Association football defenders
Footballers at the 2016 Summer Olympics
Olympic footballers of Colombia
Atlético Nacional footballers
Alianza Petrolera players
Millonarios F.C. players
K.A.A. Gent players
Toulouse FC players
RC Lens players
Categoría Primera A players
Belgian Pro League players
Ligue 1 players
Ligue 2 players
Colombian expatriate footballers
Colombian expatriate sportspeople in Belgium
Expatriate footballers in Belgium
Colombian expatriate sportspeople in France
Expatriate footballers in France